The 1947-48 Liga Bet was the abandoned second tier season of league football in the British Mandate for Palestine. The league started in October 1947 and was abandoned in January 1948 due to the difficulty of holding regular league fixtures during the 1947–48 Civil War in Mandatory Palestine.

League tables (as of 3 January 1948)

North Division

South Division

References

Liga Bet seasons
Palestine
2